Acyl-CoA dehydrogenase family, member 10 is a protein that in humans is encoded by the ACAD10 gene.

Structure 

This gene encodes a member of the acyl-CoA dehydrogenase family of enzymes (ACADs), which participate in the beta-oxidation of fatty acids in mitochondria. The encoded enzyme contains a hydrolase domain at the N-terminal portion, a serine/threonine protein kinase catalytic domain in the central region, and a conserved ACAD domain at the C-terminus. Several alternatively spliced transcript variants of this gene have been described, but the full-length nature of some of these variants has not been determined.

Clinical significance 

In Pima people, ACAD10 has been identified as a gene associated with type 2 diabetes, insulin resistance, and impaired lipid metabolism. Specifically, two single nucleotide polymorphisms, rs601663 and rs659964, have been significantly correlated with these symptoms in a large population of both the Pima people and American Indians.

Interactions 

Using affinity capture mass spectrometry, an interaction is inferred when a bait protein is affinity captured from cell extracts by either polyclonal antibody or epitope tag and the associated interaction partner is identified by mass spectrometric methods. Using this method, ACAD10 has been shown to interact with P2RY8, NDUFA10, NTRK3, SLC2A12, LPAR4, PTH1R, COLEC10, APP, MAS1, CD79A, BSG, and Ubiquitin C.

References

External links

Further reading 

 
 
 
 
 
 
 

Proteins
Genes on human chromosome 12